Anđelko Aleksić (1876 – 27 May 1904) was a Macedonian Serb Chetnik commander (voivode). He and Đorđe Cvetković led the first two armed bands of the Serbian Chetnik Organization, sent from the Kingdom of Serbia into Ottoman Macedonia to fight for the liberation of Macedonia.

Life
Anđelko Aleksić was born in Midinci, which at the time was part of the Ottoman Empire. He was a pečalbar (seasonal worker) in Belgrade, and had come since being a youngster. In 1897 he joined the Internal Macedonian Revolutionary Organization (IMRO), and he participated in the Ilinden Uprising (1903). After the uprising had been suppressed, Aleksić returned to wintering in Belgrade.  He was working as a cook at the kafana (restaurant) called "Orient" at the beginning of the 20th century. When the revolutionary organization known as the Serbian Chetnik Organization was formed with the aim of liberation of Old Serbia (Kosovo) and Macedonia from the Ottoman Empire, he immediately joined the organization.

On 25 April 1904, two bands (četa) of some 20 fighters under voivodes Anđelko Aleksić and Đorđe Cvetković swore oath in a ceremony of the Serbian Chetnik Committee (Dr. Milorad Gođevac, Vasa Jovanović, Žika Rafailović, Luka Ćelović, Ljubomir Kovačević, Nikola Spasić and General Jovan Atanacković), with prota Nikola Stefanović holding the prayers. The Committee had prepared the formation of the first bands for a number of months. 

The Chetniks were sent for Poreče, and on 8 May they headed out from Vranje, to Buštranje, which was divided between Serbia and Turkey. Vasilije Trbić, who guided them, told them that the best way was to go through the Kozjak and then down to the Vardar. The two voivodes however, wanted the fastest route, through the Kumanovo plains and then to Četirac. They managed to enter Turkish territory but were subsequently exposed in the plain Albanian and Turkish villages, and the Ottomans closed in on them from all sides, and they decided to stay on the Šuplji Kamen, which gave them little defence instead of meeting the army on the plains; in broad daylight, the Ottoman military easily poured bombs over the hill and killed all 24 of the Chetniks (27 May 1904).

There was opposition to the Četnik Campaign, especially after  the disaster of that first Aleksić četa. The Serbian press came out against the campaign and wrote that support of the četas should be forbidden from "sending people to the slaughterhouse." The Serbian Foreign Minister felt the Četnik Campaign  would upset their delicate negotiations with the Ottoman Empire.

References

Sources

 (see also pogledi.rs/Одломак)

1876 births
1904 deaths
People from Kičevo Municipality
People from Manastir vilayet
19th-century Serbian people
20th-century Serbian people
Serbian rebels
Serbian military leaders
Rebels from the Ottoman Empire